The 2010–11 Australian Baseball League season will be the inaugural season of the re-launched Australian Baseball League, contested between six teams representing the mainland national and state capitals: Adelaide Bite, Brisbane Bandits, Canberra Cavalry, Melbourne Aces, Perth Heat and Sydney Blue Sox. Each of the teams take the place of one of the state teams from the 2010 Claxton Shield, with the exception of Canberra which was introduced as a new team. Clubs form a roster of up to 35; of which 22 will comprise the active roster named for each of the ten rounds of the regular season and each series of the finals for those teams that qualify.

Adelaide Bite

Brisbane Bandits

Canberra Cavalry

Melbourne Aces

Perth Heat

Sydney Blue Sox

References